Asesino (Spanish for "assassin" or "murderer") is an American deathgrind supergroup and a side project of Fear Factory guitarist Dino Cazares. The band has featured members of Brujeria, Fear Factory, Sepultura, Sadistic Intent, Possessed, Ministry, and Static-X.

Asesino sometimes play Slayer covers live, most notably "Angel of Death" and "Raining Blood". As with Brujeria, the lyrics are sung entirely in Spanish and with the same subject matter of death, violence and perversion. Guitarist Asesino describes the band as "the new Brujeria." Asesino also has the tendency of making satirical comments during the show, and when playing Brujeria songs, change the original lyrics to something more fitting.

Asesino made a guest appearance as a group of Mexican doctors in episode 57 of Metalocalypse on Adult Swim.

Members
Asesino (Dino Cazares) – guitars (2002–present)
Maldito X (Tony Campos) – bass, vocals (2002–present)
Sadístico (Emilio Márquez) – drums (2002–present)

Former members
Greñudo (Raymond Herrera) – drums (on Corridos de Muerte) (2002)
Sepulculo (Andreas Kisser) – guitars (on Cristo Satanico) (2006)

Timeline

Discography
Corridos de Muerte (2002)
Cristo Satánico (2006)

External links
 Asesino on Myspace

Deathgrind musical groups
Death metal musical groups from California
Masked musicians
Musical groups established in 2002
Musical groups disestablished in 2003
Musical groups reestablished in 2006
Musical groups disestablished in 2007
Musical groups reestablished in 2009
Musical groups from Los Angeles
Heavy metal supergroups
American musical trios
2002 establishments in California
Listenable Records artists